2019 in paleoentomology is a list of new fossil insect taxa that were described during the year 2019, as well as other significant discoveries and events related to paleoentomology that were scheduled to occur during the year.

New taxa

Coleopterans

Dictyopterans

Dipterans

Hemipterans

Hymenopterans

Mecopterans

Neuropterans

Odonatans

Orthopterans

Phasmatodea

Plecopterans

Strepsipterans

Thysanoptera

Trichopterans

Other insects

General research
 A study aiming to estimate the taxonomic diversity of insects in deep time is published by Schachat et al. (2019).
 A study on the phylogenetic relationships of the Carboniferous insect Stephanastus polinae is published by Beutel, Yan & Kukalová-Peck (2019).
 A study on the age and depositional environment of the Xiaheyan insect fauna (Ningxia, China) is published online by Trümper et al. (2019).
 A study on 240-million-year-old insect fossils from the Mount San Giorgio Lagerstätte (Switzerland–Italy), evaluating their implications for the knowledge of the time scale of insect evolution, is published by Montagna et al. (2019).
 A study on insect fossils from the Upper Triassic Laohugou Formation (Hebei, China) is published by Huang et al. (2019).
 The earliest evidence of exophytic oviposition (eggs laid directly on the outer surface of plants) known so far, in the form of insect eggs (probably produced by roachoids) preserved on plant fossils, is reported from the Carboniferous (Gzhelian) of the Saale Basin (Germany) by Laaß & Hauschke (2019).
 A study on the frequency and diversity of damage types caused by insect oviposition in plants from the Upper Triassic Yangcaogou Formation, Middle Jurassic Jiulongshan Formation and Lower Cretaceous Yixian Formation (China), assessing the degree of plant host specificity, is published by Lin et al. (2019).
 A study on the plant specimens (ferns, gymnosperms and angiosperms) from the Lower Cretaceous Araripe Basin (Brazil) preserving evidence of plant–insect interactions and potentially of paleoecological relationships between plants and insects is published by Edilson Bezerra dos Santos Filho et al. (2019).
 Leaves of members of the family Nymphaeaceae preserving evidence of insect herbivory are reported from the Albian Utrillas Formation (Spain) by Estévez-Gallardo et al. (2019).
 A study on changes in insect and plant communities across the Paleocene–Eocene boundary within the Hanna Basin (Wyoming, United States) is published by Azevedo Schmidt et al. (2019).
 A study on insect pupation structures from the Campanian dinosaur nesting site at the Egg Mountain locality (Two Medicine Formation; Montana, United States) is published by Freimuth & Varricchio (2019).
 Redescription and a study on the phylogenetic relationships of a Permian orthopteran Vologdoptera maculata is published by Aristov & Gorochov (2019).
 A study on the phylogenetic relationships of the Paleocene orthopteran Hylophalangopsis chinensis is published by Wang et al. (2019).
 308-million-years-old female palaeodictyopteran nymphs, preserving large pointing structures interpreted as ovipositors, are described from the Piesberg quarry in northwestern Germany by Kiesmüller et al. (2019).
 A study on the anatomy of immature stages and adult specimens of members of Palaeodictyopterida, evaluating its implications for different hypotheses about lifestyle strategies of these insects, is published by Prokop et al. (2019).
 A revision of phyloblattid and compsoblattid blattodeans from the Carboniferous (Kasimovian) of the Souss basin (southwestern High Atlas mountains, Morocco) is published by Belahmira et al. (2019).
 A fossil ootheca resembling those of extant mantises is described from the Cretaceous amber from Myanmar by Li & Huang (2019).
 An assemblage of 14 dictyopterans is reported from the Santonian amber from Yantardakh (Taymyr Peninsula, Russia) by Vršanský (2019).
 A study on the anatomy and life habits of alienopterans is published by Wipfler et al. (2019).
 A redescription of a female and a description of a male of the parvaverrucosid species Parvaverrucosa annulata from the Cretaceous amber from Myanmar is published by Węgierek, Cai & Huang (2019).
 A gregarious assemblage of protopsyllidioids belonging to the genus Postopsyllidium is reported from a single piece of the Cretaceous amber from Myanmar by Hakim, Azar & Huang (2019).
 A redescription of the fossil water strider species Aquarius lunpolaensis based on new specimens from the Lunpola and Nima basins of central Tibet is published by Cai et al. (2019).
 New specimens of Mesodiphthera grandis are described from the Norian insect locality at Dinmore (Queensland, Australia) by Lambkin (2019), who interprets this taxon as a hairy cicada and the oldest known cicada reported so far.
 Revision of members of extinct cicadomorphan family Hylicellidae from the Norian Mount Crosby Formation (Queensland, Australia) is published by Lambkin (2019).
 A group of heteropteran nymphs preserved together with their eggs, including two nymphs caught in the act of hatching, is described from the Dominican amber by Hörnig, Fischer & Haug (2019).
 A female specimen of the myopsocid species Myopsocus arthuri is described from the Dominican amber by Hakim et al. (2019).
 A study on the phylogenetic relationships of fossil ichneumonid wasps is published by Klopfstein & Spasojevic (2019), who transfer the species "Plectiscidea" lanhami to the genus Allomacrus.
 A fossilized hind wing of a member of the family Ichneumonidae is described from a Calabrian sandstone from Madeira by Góis-Marques et al. (2019).
 Revision of fossil figitids from the Late Eocene of Florissant (United States) and from the Oligocene–Miocene boundary of Rott-am-Siebengebirge (Germany) is published by Pujade-Villar & Peñalver (2019).
 A study on the evolutionary history of colletid bees belonging to the group Neopasiphaeinae, as indicated by phylogenetic, biogeographic and paleontological data, is published by Almeida et al. (2019).
 The first corydalid larva preserved with gut contents is described from the Lower Cretaceous Yixian Formation (China) by Zhao et al. (2019).
 Seed of the ginkgoalean Yimaia capituliformis with damage interpreted as likely oviposition lesions inflicted by a kalligrammatid lacewing is described from the Middle Jurassic Jiulongshan Formation (China) by Meng et al. (2019).
 A long-necked neuropteran larva, preserving a unique combination of anatomical characters present in various neuropterans families, is described from the Cretaceous amber from Myanmar by Haug et al. (2019).
 A larval lacewing with unusually large mandibulo-maxillary piercing stylets is described from the Cretaceous amber from Myanmar by Haug, Müller & Haug (2019).
 A neuropteran larva with prominent curved stylets is described from the Cretaceous amber from Myanmar by Haug, Müller & Haug (2019).
 A late instar strepsipteran larva, probably belonging to the genus Mengea, is described from the Eocene Baltic amber by Pohl et al. (2019).
 A review of plants, fungi and animals found associated with fossil beetles from Myanmar, Dominican and Mexican amber is published by Poinar (2019).
 A study on the phylogenetic relationships of Tunguskagyrus is published by Beutel, Yan & Lawrence (2019).
 A study on the phylogenetic relationships of Leehermania prorova is published online by Fikáček et al. (2019).
 Extremely miniaturized insects interpreted as larvae of beetles belonging to the family Ripiphoridae and the subfamily Ripidiinae are described from the Cretaceous amber from Myanmar by Batelka et al. (2019).
 A male specimen of the monotomid beetle species Cretakarenni birmanicus is described from the Cretaceous amber from Myanmar by Jiang, Liu & Wang (2019).
 A protrusible prey-capture apparatus is reported in two stenine rove beetles from the Cretaceous amber from Myanmar (a specimen of Festenus gracilis and a specimen representing a new species of Festenus) by Cai et al. (2019).
 The first case of aggregation behaviour of the rove beetle Clidicostigus arachnipes is reported from the Cretaceous amber from Myanmar by Yin & Zhuo (2019).
 Six well-preserved specimens of the silvanid beetle Protoliota, confirming the presence of remarkable sexual dimorphism in this genus, are reported from the Cretaceous amber from Myanmar by Cai & Huang (2019).
 A study on the phylogenetic relationships of extant and fossil members of the scarab beetle subfamily Aclopinae is published by Neita‐Moreno et al. (2019).
 A flower chafer belonging to the tribe Trichiini is described from the Baltic amber by Alekseev (2019), representing the earliest fossil record of the tribe Trichiini and the first known flower chafer in Baltic amber.
 Two beetle larvae with unusually large terminal end compared to that in extant forms, identified as representatives of Scraptiidae, are described from the Eocene Baltic amber by Haug & Haug (2019).
 A study comparing extant beetle fauna from Maungatautari (New Zealand) with the late Holocene beetle assemblage from two central North Island fossil sites is published by Watts et al. (2019).
 Poisonous setae are identified in a small caterpillar from the Eocene Baltic amber by Poinar & Vega (2019).
 A revision of putative fossil members of the family Hepialidae is published by Simonsen, Wagner & Heikkilä (2019).
 A study on the holotype specimen of the Late Jurassic acrocerid fly Archocyrtus kovalevi is published by Khramov & Lukashevich (2019), who report evidence of an extremely long proboscis, almost twice the length of the body of this insect.
 A study on the phylogenetic relationships of extant and fossil acrocerid flies is published by Gillung & Winterton (2019).
 A study on the phylogenetic relationships of the Cretaceous members of the family Ceratopogonidae is published by Borkent (2019).
 A study on the morphology and phylogenetic relationships of Lebanoculicoides daheri, as indicated by data from a male specimen from the Cretaceous Lebanese amber, is published by Borkent (2019).
 The first record of chironomid larva from amber, comparable to larvae of modern representatives of the genus Bryophaenocladius, is reported from the Eocene Baltic amber by Baranov et al. (2019).

References

2019 in paleontology
Paleoentomology